Max Good (born July 16, 1941) is an American basketball coach.  He is the former head men's basketball coach at Loyola Marymount University.  He was promoted from his assistant's job to replace Bill Bayno, who resigned due to illness after three games into the 2008–09 season, his first and only season with the Lions.  Good also replaced Bayno for the 2000–01 season at UNLV after Bayno was dismissed as head coach.

Prior to arriving at Loyola Marymount, Good spent seven seasons as the head coach at Bryant University,  where he led the Bulldogs to five-straight NCAA Division II Sweet 16 finishes, as well as an NCAA Division II Championship runner-up finish in 2004–05.

After leading the Lions to an 18–15 overall record (9–7 in conference), Good was named West Coast Conference Coach of the Year for 2009-10 season by Collegeinsider.com.  The 18 wins were the most by Loyola Marymount since 1996. The 15-game turnaround from last season's 3–24 campaign was the second-largest in the nation, as well as the second-largest turnaround in LMU history.

On March 17, 2010, Good led the Lions against the University of the Pacific Tigers at LMU's Gersten Pavilion. This was the Lions' first post-season tournament under Good and its first since 1990.

Prior to joining the Lions as an assistant, Good led Bryant University to a 132–86 record in seven seasons. In his last year at Bryant, the Bulldogs earned an NCAA Division II Tournament berth for the fifth consecutive year. When Good was named head coach at Bryant in 2001, he inherited a program that had four straight losing seasons. He posted a 17–14 record in his second season and Bryant was named Most Improved team by the New England Basketball Coaches. By 2004 season, Good lead the Bulldogs to 23 wins, earning the school's first NCAA tournament berth in 24 years. They advanced to the Sweet Sixteen. In his fourth year, Good led Bryant to a 25–9 record. They played in NCAA Division II Championship, falling to Virginia Union in the title game, 63–58.

Good came to Bryant after spending the 2000–01 season as the interim head coach at the University of Nevada, Las Vegas (UNLV). He posted a record of 13–9 in his one season with the Runnin' Rebels. He joined the UNLV staff in 1999–00 as an assistant.

Prior to joining the UNLV staff, Good served as the head coach at Maine Central Institute (MCI) for 10 seasons (1989–1999). He compiled a 275–30 (.902) record over that span. MCI was five times the New England Prep School Athletic Conference champion during his tenure. MCI captured back-to-back conference championships (1997–1999). They were 69–4 over those two years (35–0 and 34–4). Good's MCI teams went undefeated three times (26–0 in 1989–90, 24–0 in 1990–91, and 35–0 in 1997–98). From 1989 to 1992, Maine Central Institute compiled 79 straight victories. His 1992 squad was 29–1.

His coaching background includes five seasons as the assistant coach at Eastern Kentucky University in Richmond, Kentucky (1976–1981). He replaced Ed Bhyre as head coach in 1981 and served through 1989. His overall record at EKU was 96–129 (.427). He carded a 19–11 record in 1987 and was named the Ohio Valley Conference Coach of the Year. In 1988, the Colonels went 18-11.

Good began his coaching career at Madison High School in Richmond, Kentucky in 1970. He served as the junior varsity coach for three seasons (1970–1973) and then served three seasons (1973–7196) as the head coach. His 1975 team finished 23–6 and was ranked as a top ten team in Kentucky by the Associated Press.

References

External links
 Pratt Community College profile

1941 births
Living people
American men's basketball coaches
Bryant Bulldogs men's basketball coaches
Eastern Kentucky Colonels men's basketball coaches
High school basketball coaches in the United States
Junior college men's basketball coaches in the United States
Loyola Marymount Lions men's basketball coaches
UNLV Runnin' Rebels basketball coaches